ZF Openmatics, a subsidiary of ZF Friedrichshafen AG, is a provider of telematics platforms for vehicle fleets. The company Openmatics s.r.o. was founded in Pilsen, Czech Republic in 2010. With connection with ZF Group the company was renamed to ZF OPENMATICS on 1. 9. 2019. Company develops and operates an open telematics platform which is independent of vehicle and component suppliers.

Openmatics telematics system
The Openmatics system is a tool for improving fleet vehicle management and consists of four components: an on-board-unit, web portal, software applications, and online shop. 
The onboard unit is used for data transfer to and from vehicles, thus it can send service and location data. The web portal enables access to the received data and can be used for application and vehicle management. The software applications are developed by in-house or 3rd party developers using a software development kit, also called SDK. Software application development is mainly focused on the following categories: driveline and diagnostics, eco and savings, fleet management, safety and security, entertainment and info.

References

External links 

 

Software companies established in 2010
Software companies of the Czech Republic
Plzeň
2010 establishments in the Czech Republic
Logistics companies